Elseya kalumburu is a species of large river snapping turtles from Australia. It is a member of the nominate subgenus Elseya.

References

Elseya (Elseya)
Reptiles described in 2022
Turtles of Australia